Charles Williams Nash (January 28, 1864 – June 6, 1948) was an American automobile entrepreneur who served as an executive in the automotive industry. He played a major role in building up General Motors as its 5th President. In 1916, he bought Thomas B. Jeffery Company, makers of the popular Rambler automobile, renamed it Nash Motors, and played an independent role in an automobile industry increasingly dominated by the Big Three: General Motors, Ford, and Chrysler. His profits came from focusing on one well-designed car in the upper-medium price range. He bought several distressed companies in Wisconsin, merging them and installing advanced managerial accounting procedures while cutting costs and focusing on long-term growth. He retired as president in 1932, but remained chairman of the board. His major acquisition was the merger in 1937 with the Kelvinator Company, which made refrigerators. During World War II, Nash-Kelvinator greatly expanded to manufacture aircraft engines and parts.

Early life 
Nash was born to a poor farming family in Cortland, Illinois, on what is now Route 38 — Lincoln Highway. His mother was Anna E. "Annie" Cadwell (1829–1909) who married David L. Nash. Other Nash siblings included Mazovia (b. 1862), George C. (b. 1866), and Laura W. (b. 1868).

Charles' parents separated when he was six years old and abandoned him. As a result of a court order, he worked as a farmhand in Michigan as an indentured servant under an agreement that was to last until he was 21. He had only three months of schooling per year while he was "bound out" to perform farm chores.

At age 12, Nash ran away and became a farmhand, first in Grand Blanc, Michigan for $8 per month, then for Alexander McFarland in Mount Morris, Michigan for $12 per month. On McFarland's farm, he learned the carpentry trade from John Shelben and formed the "Adams & Nash" concern to press hay. While pressing hay on the Halleck farm, he met his future wife, Jessie Halleck, and married her on April 23, 1884.

Automobile industry 
Durant hired Nash in 1890 for $1 per day as an upholstery stuffer. Within six months, he was promoted to superintendent of the factory. Within 10 years, Nash became vice president and general manager of the Durant-Dort Carriage Company. Nash introduced the straight-line belt conveyor into the assembly of carriages. In 1897, Nash had a chance to drive an early automobile and immediately became interested in its commercial possibilities.

General Motors 
By 1910, the chief business of Durant-Dort Carriage Company was building automobile bodies for the Buick unit of General Motors, which was founded in 1908 by Durant, who had bought Buick in 1904. Durant found himself short of both capital and skilled management. Durant brought Nash to Buick to oversee production. Durant was not concerned that Nash did not have any automotive industry experience, his expertise was in dealing with people and also how to organize an efficient production line. James J. Storrow followed the recommendation and appointed Nash as vice-president of Buick on 13 December 1910.

Nash was searching for an expert in day-to-day manufacturing operations so he could focus more on sales, supplier relations, and logistics. In 1912, Nash hired Walter P. Chrysler from the American Locomotive Company to be Buick's works manager.

In late 1912, Durant was fired by the General Motors board and on November 19, Nash was elected as the fifth president of the company because he had earned the trust of the bankers who controlled the board of directors. Durant had acquired numerous automakers without analyzing their contribution to the product mix and some like Elmore, Cartercar, Reliance Motor Truck, Welch Motor Car, were money-losing operations that left the company financially overextended; thus, there was concern if it could even survive another five years.

Under Nash's leadership, General Motors made immense gains in profits earned and in the number of vehicles produced. Nash focused on making GM a more efficient operation by getting rid of unprofitable products and streamlining manufacturing. He arranged for GM to purchase 51% of axle maker Weston-Mott. Cost-cutting and higher sales were his top priorities. There was tight control of inventories and cash at the corporate level as well as changes designed to maximize production at each factory.

Nash had restored GM to organizational stability and financial health. Profitability was restored with 1914 results at $7.2 million and doubling for 1915 as well as again doubling for 1916 with the automaker taking in nearly $29 million.

His strategy of consolidating into large units paid off: he combined three different truck operations into one and merged several parts-making operations. Keen on building up an international market, he set up the General Motors Export Company to handle international sales. He also moved GM's general offices from New York to Detroit, created a new purchasing office, and set up a new accounting office with standardized accounting procedures. However, Nash was reluctant to pay dividends to shareholders 

By late 1915 and early 1916, Billy Durant attempted to reassert his control over the company, and Nash was caught in the power struggle between Durant and bankers. By May 1916, Durant regained controlled the majority of voting stock. He offered Nash a $1 million annual salary to remain with the automaker. Nash described the salary was "more than a man’s worth" and resigned on June 1.

Nash Motors 
After his clash with Durant, Nash resolved never again to work for someone else. Along with former GM executives, James J. Storrow and Walter P. Chrysler, Nash attempted to take over Packard, but the luxury car maker's board of directors demurred.

Nash learned that the heirs of the Jeffery Motor Company of Kenosha, Wisconsin, were anxious to retire. It was best known for its Rambler brand of cars and numerous innovations. Nash bought out the pioneering automaker in August 1916 with a down payment check of half-million dollars and the total deal worth $5 million (some reports indicate the price was $9 million). One of the first major investors was Alfred P. Sloan. While Jeffery Motors had total stock of $3 million, the newly incorporated Nash Motors became a major force with a capital stock of almost $24 million on 29 July 1916.

In 1917, he renamed the company Nash Motors. The 1917 Nash Model 671 was the first automobile to bear the name of the new company's founder. Nils Erik Wahlberg, a former GM engineer, developed new cars and engines for the 1918 model year. Nash Motors became successful almost immediately, with sales totaling 31,008 trucks and cars by 1919.

Nash was able to negotiate procurement contracts with the United States Army during World War I that made the company one of the largest producers of trucks in the nation. In 1918, Nash was appointed to take charge of engineering and production of aircraft matters for the war effort.

In addition to running his own company, Charles Nash also served as president of the luxury automaker LaFayette Motors until Nash Motors bought out the company in 1924.

By 1929, the Big Three automakers (GM, Ford, and Chrysler) controlled 75 percent of the automobile market. Nash Motors was in fourth place producing 138,000 vehicles in 1928.

Nash focused on producing one high-quality automobile for the upper-medium price range, later adding a smaller, less expensive model, the Ajax. Nash realized he could never compete with the market diversity of the Big Three, so he based his profits on careful management, close attention to costs, and opportunities for expansion. Nash was a hands-on executive, who concentrated on developing more efficient purchasing and setting up accounting procedures that would specify the source of costs and profits.

Nash acquired other car companies, including Mitchell Motors of Racine in 1923 and LaFayette Motors of Milwaukee in 1924.

During the Great Depression the Nash cars were popular providing high quality, durability, and the look of luxury at a relatively low price. The company also saw an opportunity in the luxury car market segment and introduced the top-of-the-line Ambassador models on a  wheelbase  in 1932 that soon earned the nickname of "Kenosha Duesenbergs" because of their quality.

During a time when most other were operating in the red or going bankrupt, Nash Motors was only one of two firms in the automobile industry generating a profit. In November 1932, Nash was honored by Sales Management (now Sales Management and Marketing) magazine as "The Pace Setter for the Auto Industry."
 
Nash gave up the presidency in 1932, but remained board chairman. Nash wanted George W. Mason as his executive vice president and to have Mason he had to buy Kelvinator a leading manufacturer of refrigerators.

After twenty years of success in running his company, Nash turned it over in 1937 and the merged company was renamed Nash-Kelvinator.

Retirement 
Nash retired from his namesake company in 1936 to live in California. His health started to fail during his wife's illness and eventual death in 1947. He is quoted as describing himself as "the most common cuss that lived." He died in 1948 at the age of 84 in Beverly Hills, California. Always proud of belonging to the "common people", he left an estate valued at around US$50 million (approximately US$ in  dollars ). Nash was interred in the Forest Lawn Memorial Park Cemetery in Glendale next to his wife.

Legacy 
Nash is best remembered for responding to public demand by building smaller, more economical and affordable cars. Nash Motors was successful in marketing cars to America's middle class. Charles Nash is also recognized for lean operations in business that included scheduling production and material orders closely, carrying a small inventory, and having flexibility in meeting the changing market needs during the economic turmoil of the 1920s and 1930s. Nash is also credited with developing the straight-line conveyor belt assembly system that he first introduced at the Durant-Dort Carriage Company factory.

Charles W. Nash's achievements by 1926 were characterized as a genuine success story:

Timeline 
 1890 - Charles Nash was hired to stuff seat cushions at Durant-Dort Carriage Company
 1904 - Durant buys Buick, takes Nash with him as assistant manager
 1910 – Charles Nash takes control of General Motors from William Durant
 1912 – Charles Nash hires Walter P. Chrysler to manage the Buick division of General Motors
 1912 – Nash becomes president of General Motors
 1916 – William Durant re-gains control of General Motors, and Charles Nash resigns
 1916 – Charles Nash buys the Thomas B. Jeffery Company, maker of the Rambler
 1917 – Thomas B. Jeffery Company is renamed "Nash Motors"
 1917 – First Nash designed car, "Model 681" is produced 
 1918 – Nash becomes the largest producer of trucks in the world, building 11,490 four-wheel drive quads for the US Army
 1919 – Nash purchased half interest in the Seamon Body Corporation of Milwaukee - the builder of bodies for Rambler, Jeffery, and Nash
 1925 – Purchased plant from the Mitchell Motor Car Company in Racine, Wisconsin
 1930 – Nash retires and becomes chairman of the Board
 1937 – Merged Nash with Kelvinator to form Nash-Kelvinator and made George W. Mason the CEO
 1948 – Nash dies

Gallery

References

External links 
 
 
 

1864 births
1948 deaths
20th-century American businesspeople
People from Cortland, Illinois
American chief executives in the automobile industry
American Motors people
Nash Motors people
American automotive pioneers
Burials at Forest Lawn Memorial Park (Glendale)
General Motors former executives
American founders of automobile manufacturers